William Hubert Burr C.E. (1851–1934) was an American civil engineer, born at Watertown, Connecticut. He received his education at the Rensselaer Polytechnic Institute.  Over several decades, he worked at various places.  In 1884 he became assistant engineer to the Phoenix Bridge Company.  After 1893 he was consulting engineer to New York departments, especially in connection with the Catskill Aqueduct work.  In 1892–1893 he had been Professor at Harvard University and 1893–1916 Professor for Civil Engineering at Columbia University. In 1904 he was appointed a member of the Isthmian Canal Commission.

As a consulting engineer, Burr was also involved with the design of several bridges, tunnels, and infrastructure projects. In the New York metropolitan area, these included the University Heights (former Harlem Ship Canal) Bridge, Harlem River Speedway, the original City Island Bridge, the original 145th Street Bridge, the Holland Tunnel, the Lincoln Tunnel, and the George Washington Bridge. Burr was also involved with projects such as the Panama Canal; a design for the Arlington Memorial Bridge; and the New York State Barge Canal.

His published works are:  
 Stresses in Bridge and Roof Trusses (1879)
 Ancient and Modern Engineering and the Isthmian Canal (1902)
 The Elasticity and Resistance of the Materials of Engineering (1883, third edition, 1912)
 The Graphic Method in Influence Lines for Bridge and Roof Computation (1905, with M. S. Falk)

References

External links
 

1851 births
1934 deaths
American civil engineers
20th-century American engineers
American engineering writers
Rensselaer Polytechnic Institute alumni
People from Watertown, Connecticut